= The Wargamers Encylopediac Dictionary =

Reference book

The Wargamers Encylopediac Dictionary is a 1981 book written and published by the American Wargaming Association.

== Contents ==
The Wargamers Encylopediac Dictionary is a specialty dictionary focusing on younger wargamers to explain terminology used in the hobby.

== Reception ==
W.G. Armintrout reviewed The Wargamers Encylopediac Dictionary in The Space Gamer No. 52. Armintrout commented that "The Wargamers Encylopediac Dictionary is certainly not going to help some newcomer trying to decipher the slang in TSG; it will be of partial help with wargames, miniatures, or D&D. I realize a lot of work was done on this booklet. Unfortunately, I think a better selection of terms and less formalism would have been a vast improvement - I don't recommend it."
